The U.S. Highways in North Dakota are the segments of the United States Numbered Highway System owned and maintained by the North Dakota Department of Transportation (NDDOT) in the US state of North Dakota.


Mainline highways

Special routes

See also

References

External links

 
US